The British florin, or two-shilling piece (2/– or 2s.) was a coin worth  of one pound, or 24 pence. It was issued from 1849 until 1967, with a final issue for collectors dated 1970. It was the last coin circulating immediately prior to decimalisation to be demonetised, in 1993, having for a quarter of a century circulated alongside the ten-pence piece, identical in specifications and value.

The florin was introduced as part of an experiment in decimalisation that went no further at the time. The original florins, dated 1849, attracted controversy for omitting a reference to God from Queen Victoria's titles; that type is accordingly known as the "Godless florin", and was in 1851 succeeded by the "Gothic florin", for its design and style of lettering. Throughout most of its existence, the florin bore some variation of either the shields of the United Kingdom, or the emblems of its constituent nations on the reverse, a tradition broken between 1902 and 1910, when the coin featured a windswept figure of a standing Britannia.

In 1911, following the accession of George V, the florin regained the shields and sceptres design it had in the late Victorian era, and it kept that motif until 1937, when the national emblems were placed on it. The florin retained such a theme for the remainder of its run, though a new design was used from 1953, following the accession of Elizabeth II. In 1968, prior to decimalisation, the Royal Mint began striking the ten-pence piece. The old two-shilling piece remained in circulation until the ten-pence piece was made smaller, and earlier coins, including the florin, were demonetised.

History

Background 

The drive for decimalisation of the currency in Britain dates as far back as 1682. Although nothing was done about early proposals, the adoption of decimal currencies in the United States, France and other nations in the late 18th and early 19th centuries renewed the call, and commissions in 1841 and 1843 called for the adoption of decimal coinage. In 1847, a motion was introduced in Parliament by Sir John Bowring calling for the introduction of a decimal currency and the striking of coins of one-tenth and one-hundredth of a pound. Bowring obtained surprisingly strong support for his motion, and the Russell government promised that a coin valued at one-tenth of a pound (two shillings) would be produced to test public opinion, with consideration to be given in future to the introduction of other decimal coins.

There was much discussion about what the coin should be calledcentum, decade, and dime were among the suggestionsbefore florin was eventually settled upon, not because of the old English coin of that name, but because the Netherlands had a florin, or gulden, about that size and value. The original florin, the fiorino d'oro of the Republic of Florence, was a gold coin struck from 1252 to 1533.

Victorian issues (1849–1901) 

The first florins were struck in 1849. They were in the Gothic style, and featured a portrait of Queen Victoria as a very young woman, with the crowned cruciform shields of the United Kingdom shown on the reverse, and the nations' emblems in the angles. The new florin closely resembles the Gothic crown of 1847; the obverse for both was designed by the Chief Engraver of the Royal Mint, William Wyon, while the reverse of both was designed by William Dyce. Unlike the crown's Gothic script, the 1849 florin has Roman lettering. The new coin made clear its value with the inscription  on the reverse. To aid in the decimal experiment, the half crown (two shillings and sixpence, or one-eighth of a pound), near to the florin in size and value, was not issued between 1850 and 1874, when it was struck again at the request of the banks, and surveys found that both coins played useful parts in commerce. Each would continue to be struck, and would circulate together, until decimalisation.

These first coins were probably a shock to the public, as for the first time in nearly 200 years a British coin featured a portrait of the monarch wearing a crown. Even more of a shock, including (allegedly) to Queen Victoria herself, was the inscription on the obverse, omitting the usual  for Dei Gratia (By the Grace of God) from the coin's inscription. This resulted in it being known as the "Godless florin". Further controversy was caused by the omission of the usual abbreviation  for Fidei Defensor (Defender of the Faith): the Master of the Mint, Richard Lalor Sheil, an Irishman and a Roman Catholic, was suspected by some of plotting to overthrow the Protestant regime. The inscription had in fact been suggested by Albert, Prince Consort, Victoria's husband. Sheil said in the House of Commons the inscription had been a mistake, and the florin was redesigned for its next issue in 1851.

The coin was by the same designers; its date was rendered in Roman numerals. The bust of Victoria and the heraldry on the reverse were largely unchanged. The Latin inscription on the obverse read  with the date, while the reverse read . Despite a Royal Commission, the drive for decimalisation soon died out; there was only lukewarm support for an 1855 motion in the Commons applauding the issuance of the florin and seeking further decimal coins. The Gothic Florin was produced each year until 1887, excepting 1861 and 1882. From 1864 until 1879, many florins were struck with die numbers on the obverse (found to the right of Victoria's brooch, possibly part of a Mint investigation into how long it took coinage dies to wear out. Beginning with some 1867 issues,  on the obverse was rendered , following the Latin practice in abbreviations of doubling a final consonant for a plural. Thus, Victoria's title changed from "Queen of Britain" to "Queen of the Britains", including the colonies and other territories.

In 1887, as part of a coinage redesign for Victoria's Golden Jubilee, a new obverse design, showing the queen as an older woman, debuted on the gold and silver coinage. This was dubbed the "Jubilee coinage" and was by Sir Joseph Boehm. The various flora were removed from the florin's reverse and were replaced by sceptres between the shields with a Garter Star in the centre. The Jubilee Head quickly proved unpopular, due in part to the crown worn by the Queen, which was deemed ridiculously small. The Jubilee florin shared its reverse with the short-lived double florin, which Gertrude Rawlings in 1898 described as "radiating kitchen pokers and tea trays". The reverse design was created and engraved by Leonard Charles Wyon (who also engraved the obverse), though it was probably influenced by the gold coinage of Charles II designed by John Roettier. All the inscriptions were in Latin letters and Arabic numerals. The inscription on the obverse read , while the reverse read , with no indication of the value. The Jubilee florin was struck each year between 1887 and 1892.

Given the unpopularity of the Jubilee bust, a committee was set up in February 1891 to recommend new designs. An obverse designed by Thomas Brock was selected, and the committee also recommended some new reverses. This advisory committee recommended a different bust (also by Brock) be used on the florin to distinguish it from the half crown. The recommendation was not accepted, and the florin used the same "Veiled Head" or "Old Head" obverse that was introduced to the silver and gold coinage in 1893. The obverse was inscribed , together with a new reverse showing three shields separated by a rose, shamrock, and thistle (symbolising England, Scotland and Ireland) under a crown, and the inscription . This reverse was created by Sir Edward Poynter, and was issued each year between 1893 and 1901, the year of Victoria's death.

Edward VII (1901–1910) 

Both sides of the florin were redesigned following the accession of Victoria's son, Edward VII, each design being created by the Chief Engraver of the Royal Mint, George William de Saulles. The florin of King Edward VII was minted every year from 1902 to 1910. Its specifications remained at 11.3 grams weight and 28.5 millimetres diameter. The obverse shows the right-facing head of the King, inscribed , while the other side features what Coincraft's Standard Catalogue of English and UK Coins deems "a most unusual and original reverse". It shows a windswept figure of Britannia standing holding a shield with her left hand and a trident with her right, and inscribed , with the date below. Peter Seaby, in his history of British coinage, described the figure of Britannia as "standing on some mythical ancient ship which could hardly be sea-worthy under her weight", but "a pleasing composition".

De Saulles created the new florin in this manner to distinguish the coin from the half crown, as there had been complaints of confusion. He probably based the design on his British trade dollar (1895). The sitter for the design was Susan Hicks-Beach, the daughter of Michael Hicks-Beach, 1st Earl St Aldwyn who had served as Chancellor of the Exchequer and ex officio Master of the Mint. The modern-day Britannia coinage, bullion pieces struck by the Royal Mint for investors and collectors, has a reverse that strongly resembles that of the Edwardian florin.

George V (1910–1936) 

Florins bearing a left-facing effigy of George V by Sir Bertram Mackennal were minted in each year of the King's reign (1910–1936) except 1910 and 1934. The initial reverse design (1911–1926) was developed internally at the Royal Mint, and is intended to be that of the 1887 double florin, to which the Jubilee florin is very similar. The weight and diameter of the coin were unchanged but, because of rises in the price of silver, the metallic composition was changed in 1920 from 0.925 silver to 50% silver, 40% copper, 10% nickel, then again in 1922 to 50% silver, 50% copper, and again in 1927 to 50% silver, 40% copper, 5% nickel, 5% zinc. The changes in alloy after 1920 were due to the Mint's trying to find a silver alloy that would remain attractive as it wore.

The modified florin, dated 1927 to 1936, was designed by George Kruger Gray and did not greatly alter the design of shields and sceptres, but removed the crowns from the shields and placed them on the sceptres. A "G", the King's initial, is at the centre of the design. The bust of the King on the obverse was slightly modified in 1927.

Edward VIII (1936) 

Throughout 1936, the year in which Edward VIII reigned, coins of all denominations continued to be struck using the designs of George V, pending preparation of the new monarch's coinage. No coins depicting Edward VIII were officially released to circulation. A pattern florin exists for King Edward, which would have been due to receive approval around the time the King abdicated in December 1936. Although there is a tradition of alternating the direction the monarch faces with each reign, and George V had faced left, Edward believed that side more flattering. Thus, the obverse depicts the left-facing effigy of the King by Thomas Humphrey Paget inscribed .

George VI (1936–1952) 

King George VI's florin, produced each year between 1937 and 1951, looks very much like the one planned for his brother Edward VIII. Like on the patterns for King Edward, the words  are omitted; they would remain absent for the coin's remaining existence. The obverse, by Thomas Humphrey Paget, shows the left-facing effigy of the King inscribed . The reverse, by Kruger Gray, depicts a crowned rose with a thistle and shamrock on either side. There is a G below the thistle and R below the shamrock, and the inscription  until 1948. From 1947, the metal content was changed, as for all British silver circulating coins, to 75% copper, 25% nickel. This was due to the need for Britain to return Lend-Lease silver to the United States. The florin's diameter and weight remained unchanged at 11.3 grams and 28.5 millimetres, despite the change of alloy.

Elizabeth II (1953–1970) 

Florins were produced for Queen Elizabeth II each year between 1953 and 1967, with proof coins dated 1970. This change was made to acknowledge the evolving British Commonwealth, which by then contained some republics. The reverse, by Edgar Fuller and Cecil Thomas, depicts a Tudor rose in the centre surrounded by thistles, shamrocks and leeks, with the Latin phrase , the denomination and the date. The designs were selected by the Royal Mint Advisory Committee following a public competition. The artists' initials appear either side of the Welsh leek at the bottom of the reverse. When the reverse of the new coin was illustrated in the press, there was no consensus as to which way was up; numismatist H.W.A. Linecar has noted that the second  in  marks the bottom of the coin.

In accordance with the plan for decimalisation of the currency (120 years after this denomination was first introduced in the initial plan to introduce a decimal currency), from 1968 the ten pence coin was introduced of the same size, weight and metal composition as the florin. Thus, the florin ceased to be struck for circulation after the 1967-dated pieces. The new and the old circulated side by side as florins prior to Decimal Day (15 February 1971) and as ten pence pieces after.

Florins (usually dated 1947 or later) remained in circulation after Decimal Day. In 1987, following a study of the currency, the Thatcher government announced its intent to issue a new ten pence piece, reduced in size. A smaller ten pence piece was issued in 1992, after which the old florin was demonetised on 30 June 1993. The florin, the first decimal coin, was the last coin in general circulation just prior to decimalisation to be withdrawn.

Mintages 
Victoria

1849 - 413,320
1851 - 1,540
1852 - 1,014,552
1853 - 3,919,950
1854 - 550,413
1855 - 831,017
1856 - 2,201,760
1857 - 1,671,120
1858 - 2,239,380
1859 - 2,568,060
1860 - 1,475,100
1862 - 594,000
1863 - 938,520
1864 - 1,861,200
1865 - 1,580,040
1866 - 914,760
1867 - 423,720
1868 - 869,940
1869 - 297,000
1870 - 1,080,648
1871 - 3,425,605
1872 - 7,199,690
1873 - 5,921,839
1874 - 1,642,630
1875 - 1,117,030
1876 - 580,034
1877 - 682,292
1878 - 1,786,680
1879 - 1,512,247
1880 - 2,161,170
1881 - 2,376,337
1883 - 3,555,667
1884 - 1,447,379
1885 - 1,758,210
1886 - 591,773
1887 - 1,776,903
1888 - 1,647,540
1889 - 2,973,561
1890 - 1,684,737
1891 - 836,438
1892 - 283,401
1893 - 1,667,415
1894 - 1,952,842
1895 - 2,182,968
1896 - 2,944,416
1897 - 1,699,921
1898 - 3,061,343
1899 - 3,966,953
1900 - 5,528,630
1901 - 2,648,870

Edward VII

1902 - 2,204,698
1903 - 995,298
1904 - 2,769,932
1905 - 1,187,596
1906 - 6,910,128
1907 - 5,947,895
1908 - 3,280,010
1909 - 3,482,829
1910 - 5,650,713

George V

1911 - 5,957,291
1912 - 8,571,731
1913 - 4,545,278
1914 - 21,252,701
1915 - 12,357,939
1916 - 21,064,337
1917 - 11,181,617
1918 - 29,211,792
1919 - 9,469,292
1920 - 15,387,833
1921 - 34,863,895
1922 - 23,861,044
1923 - 21,546,533
1924 - 4,582,372
1925 - 1,404,136
1926 - 5,125,410
1927 - 15,000 (Proof Only)
1928 - 11,087,186
1929 - 16,397,279
1930 - 5,733,568
1931 - 6,566,331
1932 - 717,041
1933 - 8,685,303
1935 - 7,540,546
1936 - 9,897,448

George VI

1937 - 13,033,183
1938 - 7,909,388
1939 - 20,850,607
1940 - 18,700,338
1941 - 24,451,079
1942 - 39,895,245
1943 - 26,711,987
1944 - 27,560,005
1945 - 25,858,049
1946 - 22,300,254
1947 - 22,910,085
1948 - 67,553,838
1949 - 28,614,939
1950 - 24,375,003
1951 - 27,431,747 

Elizabeth II

1953 - 11,998,710
1954 - 13,085,422
1955 - 25,887,253
1956 - 47,824,500
1957 - 33,071,282
1958 - 9,564,580
1959 - 14,080,319
1960 - 13,831,782
1961 - 37,735,315
1962 - 35,129,903
1963 - 25,580,000
1964 - 16,313,000
1965 - 48,723,000
1966 - 84,547,000
1967 - 22,000,000
1970 - 750,476 (Proof Only)

Notes

References

Bibliography

External links 
 Florins
 Pictures of Florins
 Florin, Coin Type from United KingdomOnline Coin Club

Coins of the United Kingdom
Pre-decimalisation coins of the United Kingdom

ru:Флорин#Английский флорин